The Mini JOD is a French trailerable sailboat that was designed by Daniel Andrieu as a one design racer and first built in 1994.

The boat is a scaled down development of the Andrieu 1991 JOD 35 (Jeanneau One Design 35).

Production
The design was built by Jeanneau in France, starting in 1994, but it is now out of production.

Design
The Mini JOD is a very small and light racing keelboat, built predominantly of fiberglass. It has a fractional sloop rig, with two sets of unswept spreaders and aluminum spars with continuous stainless steel wire rigging and a roller furling jib. There is a retractable aluminum bowsprit. The hull has a nearly plumb stem, a reverse transom, an internally mounted spade-type rudder controlled by a wheel and a lifting keel with a weighted bulb. It displaces  and has a maximum crew weight of  allowing crewing by one adult and one child.

See also
List of sailing boat types

References

Keelboats
1990s sailboat type designs
Sailing yachts
Trailer sailers
One-design sailing classes
Sailboat type designs by Daniel Andrieu
Sailboat types built by Jeanneau